The Rosetta Stone is an ancient artifact used to decipher Egyptian hieroglyphs.

Rosetta Stone may also refer to:

Music
 Rosetta Stone (band), a British gothic-rock band formed in 1988
 Rosetta Stone (1970s band), a rock band formed in 1977 by Ian Mitchell
 "Rosetta Stone", a 1992 song by Throwing Muses from Red Heaven

Other uses
 Rosetta Stone (project), a language archive project
 Rosetta Stone (software), language learning software
 Rosetta Stone (company), a software company
 Rosetta Stone Learning Center, a language school
 Double Dragon 3: The Rosetta Stone, a 1990 video game
 Rosetta Stone, a pen name used by Dr. Seuss for his book Because a Little Bug Went Ka-Choo
 Rosetta Stona, the main protagonist of the 2002 film Teknolust
 Sister Rosetta Stone, a fictional teacher for whom Sister Mary Elephant substitutes

See also
 Rosetta (disambiguation)
 Rosetta Pebble, an acoustic folk ensemble
 "Rosetta Stoned", a song by Tool from 10,000 Days